Kolman is a name, used both as a surname and given name. Notable people with the name include:

Kolman as surname 
Alojz Kolman (born 1967), Yugoslav-Slovenian artistic gymnast
Ed Kolman (1915–1985), American football player
Ernst Kolman (1892–1979), Czech philosopher
Nejc Kolman (born 1989), Slovenian football player

Kolman as given name 
Kolman Helmschmied (1471–1532), German armourer

Surnames